Gunniopsis propinqua is a succulent plant in the iceplant family, Aizoaceae. It is endemic to Western Australia.

It blooms between August and September producing white to pink flowers.

It is found among lateritic outcrops and winter wet area with  scattered distribution in the Mid West, Goldfields-Esperance and Pilbara regions of Western Australia where it grows in stony, sandy or loamy soils.

The species was first formally described by Robert Chinnock in 1983 in the article The Australian genus Gunniopsis Pax (Aizoaceae) in the Journal of the Adelaide Botanic Gardens.

References

propinqua
Flora of Western Australia
Plants described in 1983